Tom Bostelle (November 16, 1921 – February 17, 2005) was an American painter and sculptor.

Career
A native of Chester County, Pennsylvania, Bostelle won an N.C. Wyeth prize from the Chester County Art Association while still very young. He credited Cézanne as a major influence in his early career, and also admired the work of artists as diverse as Giacometti, Jackson Pollock and Willem de Kooning.

In 1947, he had his first one-man exhibition and rose to prominence alongside Andrew Wyeth. The two artists—who lived only a couple of miles apart—frequently exhibited in the same shows.

His works are in the permanent collections of the )National Portrait Gallery Delaware Art Museum in Wilmington, Delaware, West Chester University in West Chester, Pa., the Brandywine River Museum in Chadds Ford, Pa.

Collections
Brandywine River Museum - "Lenape Jesus"
National Portrait Gallery - portrait of Horace Pippin
Delaware Art Museum - 32 works by Bostelle including ''"Century Piece"'

References

External links
  Tom Bostelle
Tom Bostelle: A life in the shadows
Delaware Art Museum - Post World War II American Art
Thomas (Theodore) Bostelle at AskArt

20th-century American painters
American male painters
21st-century American painters
2005 deaths
1925 births
20th-century American sculptors
American male sculptors
20th-century American male artists